All Saints' Abbey may refer to:

 All Saints' Abbey (Baden-Württemberg)
 All Saints' Abbey (Switzerland)